Harold Raymond "Ray" Smith (born 13 September 1934) is an English former footballer who played as an inside forward. He scored 43 goals from 148 appearances in the Football League playing for Hull City, Peterborough United, Northampton Town and Luton Town. Smith also scored 75 goals from 115 appearances in the Midland League for Peterborough before their admission to the Football League in 1960.

References

1934 births
Living people
Footballers from Kingston upon Hull
English footballers
Association football inside forwards
Hull City A.F.C. players
Peterborough United F.C. players
Northampton Town F.C. players
Luton Town F.C. players
English Football League players
Midland Football League players